The Prussian G 8.3 was a 2-8-0, superheated, freight locomotive with three cylinders. It was developed to redress the lack of goods locomotives after the First World War. The inspiration to design a 2-8-0 locomotive based on the 2-10-0 Prussian G 12 came from Württemberg. The first vehicle was delivered in 1918. Compared with the G 12, the G 8.3 had one boiler shell and coupled axle fewer. After it had proved itself, a total of 85 examples of the G 8.3 were placed in service, all of which were taken over by the Reichsbahn, where they were numbered 56 101 to 56 185. No more were built thereafter because the G 8.2, with only two cylinders, was less costly to procure and maintain.

Of the 68 engines that survived the Second World War, 6 went into the Deutsche Bundesbahn, who transferred them in 1948 to private railways, and 62 to the DR in East Germany. The DR machines were retired by  1967.

The vehicles were equipped with Prussian  pr 3 T 20 tenders.

See also
 Prussian state railways
 List of Prussian locomotives and railcars

References 

 
 
 

2-8-0 locomotives
G 08.3
Standard gauge locomotives of Germany
Railway locomotives introduced in 1918
Henschel locomotives
1′D h3 locomotives
Freight locomotives